John Montroll is an American origami artist, author, teacher, and mathematician. He has written many books on origami. Montroll taught mathematics at St. Anselm's Abbey School in Washington, D.C. from 1990 to 2021.

Biography

John Montroll was born in Washington, D.C. He is the son of Elliott Waters Montroll, an American scientist and mathematician. He has a Bachelor of Arts degree in Mathematics from the University of Rochester, a Master of Arts in Electrical Engineering from the University of Michigan, and a Master of Arts in applied mathematics from the University of Maryland.

Montroll mastered his first origami book, Isao Honda's How to make Origami, at the age of six, the same age he began creating his own origami animals. He became a member of the Origami Center of America at age twelve.  He attended his first origami convention at age 14. Montroll recently retired from his job teaching at St. Anselm's Abbey School in Washington, D.C., where he taught Geometry, as well as an origami class. One of John Montroll's hobbies is whistling. He can whistle in 5 octaves and has shown this talent at two whistling conventions in Louisburg, North Carolina.

John Montroll pioneered modern origami with the publication of his first book, Origami for the Enthusiast; Dover Publications, 1979, which was the first origami book where each model is folded from single square sheet and no cuts. In the same book he also introduced the origami term "double rabbit ear fold." He is also known for the groundbreaking bases "dog base" and "insect base". John Montroll is known as the inspiration behind the single-square, no-cut, no glue approach to origami. His work in the field of origami was briefly mentioned in the York series by author Laura Ruby.

Publications
Origami for the Enthusiast; Dover Publications, 1979 
Animal Origami for the Enthusiast; Dover Publications, 1985 
Origami American Style; Zenagraf, 1990 
 Origami Sculptures (with Andrew Montroll); Antroll Pub. Co., 1990 
 Origami Sea Life (with Robert J. Lang); Dover Publications, 1990 
 Prehistoric Origami; Dover Publications, 1990 
 African Animals in Origami; Dover Publications, 1991 
 Easy Origami; Dover Publications, 1992 
 Origami Inside-Out; Dover Publications, 1993 
 Birds in Origami; Dover Publications, 1995 
 North American Animals in Origami; Dover Publications, 1995 
 Favorite Animals in Origami; Dover Publications, 1996 
 Mythological Creatures and the Chinese Zodiac in Origami; Dover Publications, 1996 
 Teach Yourself Origami; Dover Publications, 1998 
 Bringing Origami to Life; Dover Publications, 1999 
 Dollar Bill Animals in Origami; Dover Publications, 2000 
 Bugs and Birds in Origami; Dover Publications, 2001 
 A Plethora of Origami Polyhedra; Dover Publications, 2002 
 Dollar Bill Origami; Dover Publications, 2003 
 A Constellation of Origami Polyhedra; Dover Publications, 2004 
 Origami: Birds And Insects; Dover Publications, 2004 
 Origami: Wild Animals; Dover Publications, 2004 
 Easy Christmas Origami; Dover Publications, 2006 
 Christmas Origami; Dover Publications, 2006 
 Storytime Origami; Dover Publications, 2009 
 Origami Polyhedra Design; AK Peters, 2009 
 eZ Origami; Kindle Edition by Antroll Publishing Company (April 17, 2010)
 eZ Origami; Smashwords Edition by eOrigami Publishing (May 8, 2010)
 Easy Dollar Bill Origami; Dover Publications (May 20, 2010), 
 Dinosaur Origami; Dover Publications (June 9, 2010), 
 Origami Jungle Birds; Kindle Edition by Antroll Publishing Company; 1 edition (June 16, 2010)
 Origami Under The Sea (with Robert J. Lang); Dover Publications (July 15, 2010)

Notes

External links
www.johnmontroll.com
Montroll books on Amazon.com

Origami artists
American art writers
Schoolteachers from Washington, D.C.
Living people
Year of birth missing (living people)
American mathematicians
University System of Maryland alumni
University of Rochester alumni
University of Michigan College of Engineering alumni